Alfred Hitchcock's Anthology – Volume 5 is the fifth installment of Alfred Hitchcock's Anthology, one of the many Alfred Hitchcock story collection books; edited by Eleanor Sullivan. Originally published in hardcover as Alfred Hitchcock's Tales to Send Chills Down Your Spine in 1979, the book contains 29 short stories by many well-known crime fiction novelists.

Contents
A Bottle of Wine (1956) by Borden Deal
The Glass Bridge (1957) by Robert Arthur
Luck is No Lady (1957) by Robert Bloch
The Exit was a Wall (1958) by Evans Harrington
An Interlude for Murder (1958) by Paul Tabort
Peephole (1959) by Henry Slesar
Death Overdue (1959) by Eleanor Daly Boylan
The Best-Friend Murder (1959) by Donald E. Westlake
Man Bites Dog (1960) by Donald Honig
Go to Sleep, Darling (1960) by James Holding
Murder is Dominant (1961) by Glenn Andrews
A Reform Movement (1961) by Donald Martin
Remote Contraol (1962) by Jean Garris
The Bond (1962) by Bob Bristow
The Seeing Eye (1963) by Warren Donahue
Never Trust an Ancestor (1963) by Michael Zuroy
Anyone for Murder? (1964) by Jack Ritchie
Death by Misadventure (1965) by Wenzell Brown
With a Smile for the Ending (1966) by Lawrence Block
Don't Hang Up (1967) by Michael Wilson
Another War (1967) by Edward D. Hoch
Pressure (1968) by Roderick Wilkinson
The Running Man (1968) by Bill Pronzini
Sparrow on a String (1969) by Alice Scanlan Reach
The Clock is Cuckoo (1969) by Richard Deming
Esther's Dress (1970) by Donald Olson
A Gallon of Gas (1971) by William Brittain
Night of the Twisters (1972) by James Michael Ullman
Variations on a Game (1973) by Patricia Highsmith

References

1979 anthologies
Mystery anthologies
Works originally published in Alfred Hitchcock's Mystery Magazine
Dial Press books